Beniamino Giribaldi (10 January 1942 – 27 August 2021) was an Italian organ builder.

Biography
Giribaldi began studying organ building with Celestino Gandolfo. Throughout his career, Giribaldi specialized in building Tuscan organs and founded a workshop called "Fiffaro". In his shop, he built organ parts and worked on organ restorations.

Beniamino Giribaldi died in Imperia on 27 August 2021 at the age of 79.

Works
Convento di Santa Chiara (Imperia)
Chiesa di Sant'Antonio Abate (Ventimiglia)
 (Alassio)
Chiesa di San Biagio (Imperia)
 (Civezza)
Chiesa degli agostiniani (Menton)

References

1942 births
2021 deaths
Organ builders
People from Imperia